The Games of the Small States of Europe (GSSE) is a biennial multi-sport event, launched by the Republic of San Marino, organized by and featuring the National Olympic Committees of nine European small states since 1985. The Games are held at the end of May or beginning of June and feature competition in nine Summer Olympic sports.

Member countries
The games are organized by the members of the European Olympic Committees (EOC). From its initial forming at the 1984 Olympics through 2009, there were eight members; the group's ninth (Montenegro) and tenth member (Vatican City) were added in 2009 and 2018 respectively. Members all have a population of less than one million people (Cyprus is the only exception; however, its population was below one million in 1984). The participating countries are:

(*) Montenegro became the ninth GSSE country on 1 June 2009.
''(**) Vatican City became the tenth GSSE country on September 2018 through a partnership with the Italian Olympic Committee.

The Faroe Islands are also seeking to compete at the Games; however, unlike the other participants, the Islands are neither an independent state (they are an autonomous part of Denmark) nor are they an EOC member. Vatican City was expected to participate in 2021, but these games were cancelled as a result of the global Covid-19 pandemic, and are now expected to make their debut in 2023.

Editions

List of sporting disciplines
Some sports consist of multiple disciplines. Disciplines from the same sport are grouped under the same color:

 Aquatics     
 Basketball     
 Cycling     
 Gymnastics     
 Volleyball

 The planned Games of 2021 were cancelled due to the rescheduling of the 2020 Summer Olympics

All-time medal table

References

External links
Official website

 
Recurring sporting events established in 1985
Multi-sport events in Europe
1985 establishments in Europe